Keith Russell "Mister" Jennings (born November 2, 1968) is an American basketball coach, who formerly played professional in the National Basketball Association (NBA) and overseas in European leagues.

College career
Jennings, a 5'7" (1.70 m) tall point guard, attended East Tennessee State University, for four academic years (1987–91). Jennings won the 1991 Frances Pomeroy Naismith Award, given to the outstanding collegiate senior six feet tall and under, and was a second-team consensus All-American. He also led the NCAA Division I that year in three-point field goals, shooting 59 percent.

Professional playing career
Jennings was not selected in the 1991 NBA draft, and started his NBA career as a free agent. He spent three seasons in the NBA, with the Golden State Warriors (1992–95), playing in 164 games, and averaging 6.6 points and 3.7 assists in 18.0 minutes per game. Jennings' personal best in the NBA was a 23-point performance, in his next-to-last regular season game with the Warriors, on April 22, 1995.  In that game, Jennings made 8 of 10 field goals, including 3 of 4 three-pointers, and was perfect in 4 free-throw attempts in 41 minutes. He dished off 10 assists that game to cap off his best performance in the NBA.  He was selected by the Toronto Raptors in the 1995 expansion draft, but did not play for them. He also played professionally in Europe. In 2003–04 he parlayed his experience on the court to help the basketball club in Strasbourg, France.

Coaching career
From 2004 to 2007, Jennings was the head coach of the boys' varsity basketball team at the private Highland School in Warrenton, Virginia.  Jennings joined the staff at his alma mater, East Tennessee State, as a graduate assistant coach for the 2007–08 season while he completed his degree.  After a year as an assistant coach at Science Hill High School in Johnson City, Tennessee, Jennings was assistant coach at Bluefield College in Bluefield, Virginia from 2009–2014.  In 2014, he became assistant coach at Lees–McRae College in Banner Elk, North Carolina.

On July 7, 2017, Jennings was named head women’s coach at Lees–McRae.

See also
 List of shortest players in National Basketball Association history
 List of NCAA Division I men's basketball career assists leaders
 List of NCAA Division I men's basketball career steals leaders

References

External links
 NBA stats @ basketballreference.com
 French League profile
 ETSU proclaims Keith "Mister" Jennings Day (November 27, 2004) @ etsubucs.com
 Rushin, Steve. Sports Illustrated (January 29, 1991) "Hey, Mister: Keith Jennings, the little big man they call Mister, has led East Tennessee State to the big time"

1968 births
Living people
African-American basketball coaches
African-American basketball players
All-American college men's basketball players
American expatriate basketball people in Austria
American expatriate basketball people in France
American expatriate basketball people in Germany
American expatriate basketball people in Honduras
American expatriate basketball people in Spain
American expatriate basketball people in the Philippines
American expatriate basketball people in Turkey
American men's basketball coaches
American men's basketball players
American women's basketball coaches
Basketball coaches from Virginia
Basketball players from Virginia
CB Estudiantes players
East Tennessee State Buccaneers men's basketball players
Fenerbahçe men's basketball players
Golden State Warriors players
High school basketball coaches in the United States
Le Mans Sarthe Basket players
Liga ACB players
People from Culpeper, Virginia
Point guards
Real Madrid Baloncesto players
SIG Basket players
SLUC Nancy Basket players
Sportspeople from the Washington metropolitan area
Toronto Raptors expansion draft picks
Undrafted National Basketball Association players
United States Basketball League players
21st-century African-American people
20th-century African-American sportspeople